Kim Jung-Hoon is a male former international table tennis player from South Korea.

He won a bronze medal at the 2004 World Team Table Tennis Championships in the Swaythling Cup (men's team event) with Joo Se-Hyuk, Kim Taek-Soo, Oh Sang-Eun and Ryu Seung-Min for South Korea.

Four years later he won a silver medal at the 2008 World Team Table Tennis Championships in the Swaythling Cup (men's team event) with Joo Se-Hyuk, Ryu Seung-Min, Lee Jung-Woo and Lee Jin-Kwon.

See also
 List of table tennis players
 List of World Table Tennis Championships medalists

References

South Korean male table tennis players
1982 births
Living people